Fayyaz Park is situated in Muzaffargarh, Pakistan. The park is named after former Deputy Commissioner of Muzaffargarh, Mr. Fayyaz Bashir. Before this park, there was resident of Deputy Commissioner. This park is operated by District Government of city. This park host spring fastival every year.

References

Muzaffargarh
Parks in Pakistan
Buildings and structures in Muzaffargarh